Fernando Torres-Gil graduated from San Jose State University in 1970 with a BA in Political Science, PhD, was the first Assistant Secretary for Aging at the Administration on Aging within the U.S. Department of Health and Human Services. He was appointed by President Clinton in 1993 and served in the position until 1997. Currently, Torres-Gil sits on the National Council on Disability as an appointee of President Obama. He is the Associate Dean of Academic Affairs and Professor of Social Welfare and Public Policy at the UCLA Luskin School of Public Affairs. He is the Director of the UCLA Center for Policy Research on Aging and is a member of the AARP Board of Directors. Torres-Gil also holds the position of Adjunct Professor of Gerontology at the USC Davis School of Gerontology, having served as Professor of Gerontology and Public Administration at USC before moving to UCLA. In December 2022, Torres-Gil as a fellow by the American Academy of Social Work and Social Welfare for 2023.

References

External links
UCLA Luskin School of Public Affairs
National Council on Disability
USC Davis School of Gerontology

American gerontologists
UCLA Luskin School of Public Affairs faculty
University of Southern California faculty
Living people
United States Assistant Secretaries for Aging
Clinton administration personnel
Year of birth missing (living people)